The Ministry of Public Works is a government ministry, responsible for public works in Zimbabwe. The incumbent minister is Theresa Makoni and the deputy minister is Guy Georgias.

References

Government of Zimbabwe
Zimbabwe